The 2023 Nadeshiko League is the 35th season of the Nadeshiko League, the second or third-tier leagues for women's association football in Japan. It is also the 19th season in its current format.

Teams

Division 1

Division 2

League table

Top scorers

Division 1

Division 2

See also
 Japan Football Association (JFA)
 2023 in Japanese football
 2022–23 WE League season
 2023 Empress's Cup
 2022–23 WE League Cup

References

External links
 Official website 
  Official website 

Nadeshiko League seasons
2–3
L